Aleix Coch Lucena (born 18 October 1991) is a Spanish footballer who plays for CE Sabadell FC as a central defender.

Club career
Born in Tarragona, Catalonia, Coch was a product of local Gimnàstic de Tarragona. In June 2010, while still a youth player, he was called to train with the first team to cover for injured players. On 19 June he made his debut with the main squad, replacing fellow youth graduate Fran Vélez in the 82nd minute of a 0–1 away defeat against UD Las Palmas in the Segunda División championship.

On 10 July 2012, after spending three full seasons with the farm team, Coch was promoted to Nàstic's main roster alongside Sergio López, Ñoño, Eugeni and his cousin Joel Coch. During the campaign he appeared in 13 matches (nine starts, 781 minutes of action), as the club missed out on promotion play-off qualification.

On 20 October 2013, Coch scored his first goal for Gimnàstic, netting the first through a free kick in a 2–1 home win over Valencia CF Mestalla. He was later linked to that opponent in January of the following year, but the deal collapsed.

In July 2014, Coch joined neighbouring CE L'Hospitalet. On 14 July 2016, he moved to fellow third-tier club CF Badalona still in his native region.

Personal life
Coch's family was widely related to football. His father Enric was a goalkeeper, while his uncles Ramón and Santi were a forward and a defender, respectively; his two cousins, Denis and Joel, also represented Pobla.

References

External links

1991 births
Living people
Sportspeople from Tarragona
Spanish footballers
Footballers from Catalonia
Association football defenders
Segunda División players
Segunda División B players
Tercera División players
CF Reus Deportiu players
CF Pobla de Mafumet footballers
Gimnàstic de Tarragona footballers
CE L'Hospitalet players
CF Badalona players
CE Sabadell FC footballers